Joseph Harris (1813–1889) was an American politician. A local official, he was a member of the Wisconsin State Senate in the 1860s.

Biography
Harris was born in London, England. He settled in what is now Sturgeon Bay, Wisconsin, in 1855. In 1833, Harris had married Charlotte Singleton. They had five children. Following Charlotte's death, Harris married Susan Perkins in 1859. They also had five children. One son, Edward, went on to become Postmaster and Mayor of Sturgeon Bay, as well as a justice of the peace. Harris died in January 1889.

Career
Harris represented the 22nd District in the Senate during the 1864 and 1865 sessions. In addition, he was County Clerk, Register of Deeds and County Treasurer of Door County, Wisconsin. Later, he was a private secretary to U.S. Senator Philetus Sawyer. A Republican, Harris was affiliated with the National Union Party.

References

Politicians from London
English emigrants to the United States
People from Sturgeon Bay, Wisconsin
Republican Party Wisconsin state senators
County clerks in Wisconsin
1813 births
1889 deaths
19th-century American politicians